The Gilgit−Baltistan Scouts, are a civil armed force of Pakistan, tasked with law enforcement in the nominally autonomous territory of Gilgit-Baltistan and border guard duties. The force was formed in 2003 under the control of the Interior Ministry of Pakistan, but it claims a tradition dating back to the Gilgit Scouts formed during the British Raj era. However, the earlier Scouts unit is now a full infantry regiment of the Pakistan Army (see Northern Light Infantry Regiment, which mostly operates in the same region as the current Scouts.

Formation 
The older Gilgit Scouts was raised by British India in 1913 to defend the princely state of Jammu and Kashmir's northern frontier. In August 1947, the Scouts along with rebels in the Jammu and Kashmir State Forces, switched allegiance to Pakistan and fought on the northern front of the Indo-Pakistani War of 1947–1948, conquering important places such as Skardu, Kargil and Drass (the latter two were subsequently recaptured by the Indian Army). In 1949, the Gilgit Scouts were split into two forces, with the wing under the original name 'Gilgit Scouts' designated for internal security operations, and a second wing, named the 'Northern Scouts', designated for major external operations. In 1964, the Northern Scouts were further bifurcated with the raising of the 'Karakoram Scouts' based in Skardu. All three forces were brought together again in 1975, under the banner of the Northern Light Infantry (then a paramilitary force). Following the 1999 Kargil War with India, where the Northern Light Infantry saw extensive combat, the force was converted into a regular regiment of the Pakistan Army. The present force of Gilgit-Baltistan Scouts was created in 2003 to fill the internal security role previously carried out by the Northern Light Infantry.

Units 

The force is composed of a headquarters, a training centre and six manoeuvre wings (each approximately the size of a battalion). About 40 platoons have been tasked with law enforcement within Gilgit-Baltistan, including seizure of unauthorised weapons. The Scouts went through an expansion phase in 2014, with more than 1,500 new personnel being recruited to help with law enforcement on critical infrastructure projects such as the Karakoram Highway. A sixth wing was also added, charged with protecting the building of the Diamer-Bhasha Dam
 HQ Wing at Gilgit
 112 Wing serving on the Line of Control under 323rd Brigade of the Pakistan Army.
 113 Wing at Skardu 
 114 Wing at Siachen
 115 Wing at Chilas
 116 Wing at Ghanche
 117 Wing at Ghizer 

Interior Ministry support
 50 Aviation Squadron

Ranks

Standard equipment 
 Automatic Rifles – 7.62 mm Heckler & Koch G3, 7.62 mm Type 56 (POF made)
 Sub-Machine Guns – 9 mm Heckler & Koch MP5
 Pistols – Glock series, Sigma series
 Sniper Rifles – POF PSR-90, Steyr SSG 69
 Hand Grenades – ARGES 84 (POF made)
 Anti-tank Weapons – RPG-7 (Rocket Launcher), M40A1 (Recoilless Rifle)
 Machine Gun – 7.62 mm Rheinmetall MG3 (POF made)
 Heavy Machine Gun – 12.7mm Type 54 (POF made)
 Mortars – Various locally produced in use
 Bullet Proof Jackets – Various local and foreign types
 Helmets – Modular Integrated Communications Helmet and indigenous helmets locally produced
 NVG goggles
 Utility Vehicles – HIT Mohafiz, Indus Hilux locally produced
 Helicopters – Bell 206, Bell 412

Appearance
The formal headwear of the scouts are somewhat similar to the ones worn by the Pakistan Rangers Punjab.

Operations and Internal Security
The Force has been performing both operational and Internal Security tasks since its raising. The Special Composite Task Force formed for the protection of Karakoram Highway is commanded by the Gilgit−Baltistan Scouts. The Force also took part in recent operations in Waziristan.

Director Generals
 Brigadier Inayat Wali (2004–2005)
 Brigadier Tassaduq Hussain Zahid (2005–2007)
 Brigadier Azmat Ali (2007–2009)
 Brigadier Nadeem Ul Ahsan Tirmizi (2009–2012)
 Brigadier Babar Allauddin (2012–2014)
 Brigadier Farooq Azam (2014–2016)
 Brigadier Ijaz Ur Rehman Tanveer (2016 - 2017)
 Brigadier Abrar Ahmed (2017 - 2019)
 Brigadier Zia Ur Rehman (2019 - 2022)
 Brigadier Arslan Israr Mirza (2022 - to date)

See also
 Civil Armed Forces
 Law enforcement in Pakistan
 Northern Light Infantry Regiment
 Gilgit Scouts
 Ladakh Scouts
 Gilgit-Baltistan Levies Force

References

External links

Gilgit−Baltistan Scouts

Law enforcement agencies of Pakistan
Military in Gilgit-Baltistan
Civil Armed Forces
2003 establishments in Pakistan
Government agencies established in 2003